BTC may refer to:

Organizations
 BAL Bashkirian Airlines (ICAO code)
 Behavior Tech Computer, a Taiwanese computer hardware manufacturer
 Belize Trans Colours, a Belizean LGBT rights organisation
 Bodoland Territorial Council
 Botswana Telecommunications Corporation
 British Transport Commission
 BTC (Bahamas), a telecommunications provider
 Bulgarian Telecommunications Company, the former name of Vivacom
 Busan Transportation Corporation, in Busan, South Korea

Education

 Balderstone Technology College
 Baptist Theological College of Southern Africa
 Bellingham Technical College
 Belmont Technical College
 Blackhawk Technical College

Places
 BTC City, a shopping and other use area in Ljubljana, Slovenia
 Batticaloa Airport (IATA code)
 Britomart Transport Centre, New Zealand
 Bucharest Tower Center, a building in Romania
 Bellevue Transit Center, the busiest bus stop in Washington state

Science and technology

Biochemistry
 Betacellulin, a protein encoded by the BTC gene

Chemistry
 Trimesic acid, or benzene-1,3,5-tricarboxylic acid, a chemical compound
 Triphosgene, or bis-(trichloromethyl)carbonate, a chemical compound

Computing
 Bit Test and Complement, an instruction in the X86 instruction set
 Bitcoin (ticker symbol), a cryptocurrency
 Block Truncation Coding, a lossy image compression technique

Sport
 Budapesti TC, Hungarian football team
 Bowerman Track Club, elite distance running group in Oregon, US

Other uses
 Baku–Tbilisi–Ceyhan pipeline
 Bicycle Torque Coupling
 BTC Touring, specification of racing car formerly used in the British Touring Car Championship
 Busch Tennis Courts, former name of the Millie West Tennis Facility
 Curtiss XBTC, an airplane